Goldfinger is a 1983 role-playing game adventure for James Bond 007 published by Victory Games. The adventure is based on Ian Fleming's 1959 novel of the same name and its 1964 film adaptation.

Plot summary
The player characters investigate Auric Goldfinger as part of a mission to stop his gold smuggling venture.

Reception
Nick Davison reviewed Goldfinger for Imagine magazine, and stated that "Altogether a very detailed effort which should last several playing sessions."

Steve Crow reviewed Goldfinger in Space Gamer No. 71. Crow commented that "Goldfinger is a good buy for any James Bond 007 GM, and of interest to any secret-agent roleplaying aficionado."

References

James Bond 007 (role-playing game) adventures
Role-playing game supplements introduced in 1983